Following is an incomplete list of past and present Members of Parliament (MPs) of the United Kingdom whose surnames begin with A. Linked years lead to articles about the election of that year

Colour key:                                                   

AR
 Sir Martin Archer-Shee; MP for Finsbury Central (1910–1918) and Finsbury (1918–1923)
Sir Richard Pepper Arden
 Edward Argar; MP for Charnwood (2015–present)
Richard Arkless
Augustus Arkwright (1868–1880)
 Francis Arkwright; MP for East Derbyshire (1874–1880)
Richard Arkwright
Benjamin Armitage
Robert Armitage
C. W. Armstrong
 Ernest Armstrong (1964–1987)
Henry Bruce Armstrong
 Hilary Armstrong (1987–2010)
 Alfred Arnold; MP for Halifax (1895–1900)
 Jacques Arnold; MP for Gravesham (1987–1997)
 Sir Tom Arnold; MP for Hazel Grove (1974–1997)
 Hugh Oakeley Arnold-Forster; MP for Belfast West (1892–1906) and Croydon (1906–1909)
William Arrol, South Ayrshire
 AS
George Ashburnham, Viscount St Asaph
Percy Ashburnham, MP for Bere Alston (1825-1830)
 David Ashby MP for North West Leicestershire (1983–1997)
William Henry Ashhurst, MP for Oxfordshire (1815 - 1830)
Anthony John Ashley, MP for Gatton (1831–1832)
Wilfrid Ashley; MP for Blackpool (1906–1918), Fylde (1918–1922) and New Forest and Christchurch (1922–1932)
 Paddy Ashdown (1983–2001)
 Jack Ashley, Baron Ashley of Stoke (1966–1992)
Anthony Ashley-Cooper, 7th Earl of Shaftesbury
Cropley Ashley-Cooper, 6th Earl of Shaftesbury
Henry Ashley-Cooper
William Ashley-Cooper
Sir Ellis Ashmead-Bartlett; MP for Eye (1880–1885) and Sheffield Ecclesall (1885–1902)
 Ellis Ashmead-Bartlett; MP for Hammersmith North (1924–1926)
 Sir Hubert Ashton; MP for Chelmsford (1950–1964)
 Joe Ashton (1968–2001)
Thomas Ashton
Sir Robert Aske, Newcastle upon Tyne East, 1923–1924, 1929–31
 Jack Aspinwall (1979–1997)
John Aspinall; MP for Clitheroe (1853)
Jonathan Ashworth, Leicester South, 2011–present
Ralph Assheton; MP for Clitheroe (1868–1880)
 Ralph Assheton; MP for Rushcliffe (1934–1945), City of London (1945–1950) and Blackburn West (1950–1955)
Fred Astbury
 John Harvey Astell; MP for Cambridge (1852–1853) and Ashburton (1859–1865)
William Astell
Sir Edward Astley, 4th Baronet
Sir Jacob Astley, 5th Baronet
Sir John Astley, 1st Baronet
 Sir John Dugdale Astley, 3rd Baronet; MP for North Lincolnshire (1874–1880)
 Sir John Astor; MP for Plymouth Sutton (1951–1959)
 John Astor; MP for Newbury (1964–1974)
 John Jacob Astor, 1st Baron Astor of Hever (1922–1945)
 Michael Astor  MP for East Surrey (1945–1951)
 Nancy Astor, Viscountess Astor (1919–1945)
 Waldorf Astor, 2nd Viscount Astor (1910–1919)
 William Astor, 3rd Viscount Astor (1935–1945,1951–1952)
H. H. Asquith, East Fife 1886–1918, Paisley, 1920–24
AT
 Arthur Atherley (1806–1807, 1812–1818, 1831–1835)
Candy Atherton, Falmouth and Camborne, 1997–2005
Llewellyn Atherley-Jones
 Albert Atkey; MP for Nottingham Central (1918–1922)
Charlotte Atkins (1997–2010)
 Humphrey Atkins (1955–1987)
John Atkins; MP for Arundel 1802–1806;1826–1832, and for the City of London in 1812–1818
 Sir Robert Atkins; MP for Preston North (1979–1983) and South Ribble (1983–1997)
Ronald Atkins, Preston North, 1966–70; 1974–79
 Victoria Atkins; MP for Louth and Horncastle (2015–present)
 Sir Cyril Atkinson; MP for Altrincham (1924–1933)
 David Atkinson; MP for Bournemouth East (1977–2005)
Henry Atkinson; (1885-1886;1886–1892)
 Norman Atkinson, Tottenham, 1964–87
 Peter Atkinson; MP for Hexham (1992–2010)
John Atkyns-Wright, MP for Oxford (1802–1807;1812-1820)
Walter Annis Attenborough, MP for Bedford
John Attersoll, MP for Wootton Bassett (1812–1813)
 Humphrey Attewell (1945–1950)
 Clement Attlee (1922–1956)
John Attwood; MP for Harwich (1841–1847)
Matthias Attwood; MP for Whitehaven (1834–1837)
Thomas Attwood, Radical MP
Matthias Wolverley Attwood; MP for Greenwich (1837–1841)
AU
Sir John Aubrey, 6th Baronet
Sir Henry Aubrey-Fletcher, 4th Baronet; MP for Horsham (1880–1885) and Lewes (1885–1910)
Thomas Austen; MP for West Kent (1845–1847)
David Austick, Ripon, 1973–74
Sir Herbert Austin, 1st Baron Austin; MP for Birmingham King's Norton (1918–1924)
Herschel Lewis Austin, Stretford, 1945–50
Ian Austin, Baron Austin (2005-2019)
Sir John Austin
 John Austin (1992–2010)
AW
 Stan Awbery (1945–1964)
Daniel Awdry; MP for Chippenham (1962–1979)
AY
 Walter Ayles (1923–1924, 1929–1931, 1945–1953)
Acton Smee Ayrton, (1857–1874)
Barbara Ayrton-Gould, Hendon North, 1945–50
Out of Order to Add

 William à Court, 2nd Baronet of Heytesbury

References 

 A